Beycuma  is a belde (town) in the central district of Zonguldak Province, Turkey.

Beycuma a former village was declared a seat of township in 1994. Main agricultural products are cereals and corn.

References

Populated places in Zonguldak Province
Zonguldak Central District
Towns in Turkey